Venita Akpofure (born 1 January 1987) is a British-Nigerian actress and video vixen. She gained prominence as a housemate in the fourth season of Big Brother Naija She plays the lead role of Nengi in Africa Magic's Unmarried.

Early life 
Akpofure was born in the United Kingdom and also hails from Delta State in Nigeria. She grew up in Benin, Edo State where she attended Our Lady of Apostles for her primary school before returning to England. She studied Accounting at Kingston Hertfordshire University in the United Kingdom.

Career 
Akpofure played the role of Mimi in AY Makun’s Ay’s Crib and also featured in 2Face Idibia’s Ihe Ne Me and Mukulu by Skales as a video vixen.  Prior to her stint in Big Brother Naija, she was best known for her role in Mukulu.

She has served as a brand ambassador for First City Monument Bank, Martini Rose and Mouka Foam. She is an ambassador for Hawaii soap alongside Mercy Eke and Sophie Alakija.

She was a housemate on the fourth season of Big Brother Naija and was evicted on day 41 of the show making her the 11th of the 20 housemates to be evicted.

Personal life 
She is a mother of two and was married to Terna Tarka for 4 years. She stated in a May interview with Punch in 2021 that leaving her husband was one of the toughest decisions she had made and that she was grateful for her support system.

Akpofure underwent breast augmentation surgery in Quartz Clinic, Istanbul in 2020. She spoke about her experience on her YouTube channel.

Filmography

Music videos

Television

Films

Awards and nominations

See also
 List of Nigerian actors

References

External links 

British Nigerian
Big Brother (franchise) contestants
1987 births
Living people
21st-century Nigerian actresses
Nigerian film actresses
Actresses from Delta State
Nigerian YouTubers
Nigerian female adult models